Anthony II may refer to:

 Anthony II, Count of Ligny (died 1557)
 Anthony II Peter Arida (1863–1955), Maronite Patriarch in 1932–1955